She's Rock n Roll is the debut extended play by Australian boy band In Stereo (Jakob Delgado, Ethan Karpathy, and Chris Lanzon). It was released on 1 April 2016 and debuted at number 11 on the Australian Albums Chart. The EP features original tracks co-written by the three 15-year-old members.

Background
In 2015, In Stereo auditioned for season 7 of The X Factor Australia, singing "Style" by Taylor Swift. They made it to the top 12 and were mentored by Guy Sebastian. They were eliminated on 20 October, coming in eighth place.

Following the elimination, the trio signed a record deal with Warner Music Australia. Their first single, "Honest", a collaboration with James Yammouni of The Janoskians, was released on 19 February 2016 and debuted at number 51 on the ARIA singles chart. 
The EP was released on 1 April 2016.

Track listing

Charts

Release history

References

2016 EPs